The canton of Neuilly-le-Réal is a former administrative division in the Arrondissement of Moulins in the Allier department in central France. It was disbanded following the French canton reorganisation which came into effect in March 2015. It consisted of 9 communes, which joined the new canton of Moulins-2 in 2015. It had 5,139 inhabitants (2012).

The canton comprised the following communes:

Bessay-sur-Allier
Chapeau
La Ferté-Hauterive
Gouise
Mercy
Montbeugny
Neuilly-le-Réal
Saint-Gérand-de-Vaux
Saint-Voir

See also
Cantons of the Allier department

References

Former cantons of Allier
2015 disestablishments in France
States and territories disestablished in 2015